Lane Smith (born August 25, 1959) is an American illustrator and writer of children's books. He is the Kate Greenaway medalist (2017) known for his eclectic visuals and subject matter, both humorous and earnest, such as the contemplative Grandpa Green, which received a Caldecott Honor in 2012, and the outlandish Stinky Cheese Man, which received a Caldecott Honor in 1992.

Background
Smith was born in Tulsa, Oklahoma, but moved to Corona, California at a young age. He spent summers in Tulsa and cites experiences traveling there via Route 66 as inspirations for his work, which combines highbrow and lowbrow elements.

He studied at Art Center College of Design in Pasadena, California, at the encouragement of his high-school art teacher, Dan Baughman, helping to pay for it by working as a janitor at Disneyland. While still a student, he illustrated for alternative newspapers, L.A. Weekly, L.A. Reader and for the punk magazine No Mag. He also illustrated album covers for Oingo Boingo (Good For Your Soul) and the Dickies (Stukas Over Disneyland). He graduated from Art Center in 1983 with a Bachelor of Fine Arts in illustration and moved to New York City, where he freelance illustrated for various publications, including TIME, Mother Jones, Ms., Sports Illustrated, The New York Times, Newsweek, Rolling Stone, The Progressive, The Atlantic, The Boston Globe, Sesame Street Magazine and others.

Smith is married to Molly Leach, who has designed many award-winning books, including nearly all of Smith's.

Children's books
Smith is most noted for his work on bestselling and award-winning children's books. He has won the British Kate Greenaway Medal (There Is a Tribe of Kids), the Bratislava Golden Apple (The Big Pets), two American Caldecott Honors (The Stinky Cheese Man and Grandpa Green), five New York Times' Best Illustrated Book awards (Halloween ABC, The Stinky Cheese Man, John, Paul, George & Ben, Grandpa Green and A House That Once Was), and lifetime achievement awards from the Carle Museum of Picture Book Art (2012), and the Society of Illustrators (2014).
 
His illustrations are created in varying media: oil paint, pen and ink, pencil, watercolor, collage and digital. Smith's artwork is also known for its experimental, textural nature. In a 2017 exhibit at the Eric Carle Museum of Picture Book Art, "Collecting Inspiration", Smith's written appreciation for the art of Alice and Martin Provensen gives us insight into his own philosophy. The statement read:

Smith has illustrated works by Florence Parry Heide, Judith Viorst, Bob Shea, Dr. Seuss, Jack Prelutsky, Eve Merriam, Roald Dahl, George Saunders, Jory John, Chris Harris and Julie Fogliano. He has both written and illustrated several books, most notably It's a Book (2010)—a New York Times bestseller for over six months and translated into over twenty-eight languages—The Happy Hocky Family (1996), The Happy Hocky Family Moves to the Country! (2002), Madam President (2008), John, Paul, George & Ben (2006) and A Perfect Day (2017).

On May 5, 2015, Roaring Brook Press published Smith's first middle-grade novel, Return to Augie Hobble, which received starred reviews from Publishers Weekly, Kirkus Reviews and Booklist. It was a Washington Post Best Book of the Year.

He is also known for his collaborations with Jon Scieszka. Introduced by their wives Molly Leach and Jeri Hansen in the late 1980s, the two collaborated on several award-winning and bestselling books from 1989 to 2007. Their two most popular books, The True Story of the 3 Little Pigs! (1989) and The Stinky Cheese Man (1992), made lists by both TIME magazine and School Library Journal ranking them among the 100 best all-time picture books. (The True Story of the 3 Little Pigs!, number 35, and The Stinky Cheese Man, 91). Smith has also illustrated some volumes of Scieszka's The Time Warp Trio novels.

He is a five-time recipient of the New York Times Best Illustrated Book award. In 2012, Smith was named a Carle Honor Artist for lifelong innovation in the field of children's books. In 2014, he received the Society of Illustrators' Lifetime Achievement award.

Smith's artistic talents have also been featured in other books and mediums. He illustrated one edition of Roald Dahl's James and the Giant Peach, and was Conceptual Designer for the 1996 Disney movie adaptation. He contributed conceptual designs for Disney and Pixar's Monsters, Inc. and the film adaptation of How the Grinch Stole Christmas!. Smith wrote and directed the 35 mm short Water Ride (1994), which starred Bill Irwin. It aired on PBS and the Bravo channel, and was screened at the Hamptons International Film Festival, among others.

Books
Some listings may not be first editions.

As writer and illustrator 
 Flying Jake (Viking Children's Books, 1988)
 Glasses (Who Needs 'Em?) (Viking, 1991)
 The Big Pets (Viking, 1991)
 The Happy Hocky Family! (Viking, 1993)
 Pinnochio: The Boy (Viking, 2002)
 The Happy Hocky Family Moves to the Country! (Viking, 2003)
 John, Paul, George & Ben (Hyperion Press, 2006)
 Madam President (Viking, 2008)
 The Big Elephant In The Room (Hyperion, 2009)
 It's a Book (Roaring Brook Press, 2010)
 It's a Little Book (Roaring Brook, 2011)
 Grandpa Green (Roaring Brook, 2011) – Caldecott Honor Book
 Abe Lincoln's Dream (Roaring Brook, 2012)
 Return to Augie Hobble (Roaring Brook, 2015)
 There Is a Tribe of Kids (Roaring Brook, 2016)
 A Perfect Day (Roaring Brook, 2017)
 A Gift For Nana (Random House Kids, 2022)

As illustrator
Written by Jon Scieszka
 The True Story of the 3 Little Pigs! (Viking,  1989)
 The Stinky Cheese Man (Viking, 1992) – Caldecott Honor Book
 Math Curse (Viking, 1995)
 Squids Will Be Squids (Viking, 1998)
 Baloney (Henry P.) (Viking, 2001)
 Science Verse (Viking, 2004)
 Seen Art? (Viking, 2005)
 Cowboy and Octopus (Viking, 2007)

Smith has also illustrated some installments of Scieszka's The Time Warp Trio series of novels.

By other writers
 Halloween ABC, Eve Merriam (Simon & Schuster), 1987
 James and the Giant Peach, Roald Dahl (Random House, 1996 edition)
The illustrations also appear in the 1997 hardcover book The Roald Dahl Treasury.
 Hooray for Diffendoofer Day!, Dr. Seuss and Jack Prelutsky (Random House, 1998)
 The Very Persistent Gappers of Frip, George Saunders (McSweeney's, 2000)
 Big Plans, Bob Shea (Hyperion, 2008)
 Princess Hyacinth, Florence Parry Heide (Schwartz & Wade, 2009)
 Lulu and the Brontosaurus, Judith Viorst (Atheneum Books, 2010)
 Lulu Walks the Dogs, Judith Viorst (Atheneum Books, 2012)
 Kid Sheriff and the Terrible Toads, Bob Shea (Roaring Brook, 2014)
 Penguin Problems, Jory John (Random House, 2016)
 I'm Just No Good at Rhyming and Other Nonsense for Mischievous Kids and Immature Grown-Ups, Chris Harris (Little, Brown, 2017)
 A House That Once Was, Julie Fogliano (Roaring Brook, 2018)
 Giraffe Problems, Jory John (Random House, 2018)

Awards and honors
 1987 – New York Times A Best Illustrated Book of the Year, Halloween ABC 
 1987 – School Library Journal, A Best Book of the Year, Halloween ABC
 1987 – Horn Book Honor List, Halloween ABC
 1987 – Booklist Editor's Choice, Halloween ABC
 1987 – Ohio Silver Buckeye Award, Halloween ABC 
 1989 – Silver Medal, Society of Illustrators, The True Story of the Three Little Pigs!
 1989 – New York Times A Best Books of the Year, The True Story of the Three Little Pigs!
 1989 – Maryland Black-eyed Susan Picture-Book Award, The True Story of the Three Little Pigs!
 1991 – Golden Apple Award, Bratislava International Biennial of Illustrations, The Big Pets
 1991 – Society of Illustrators Silver Medal, The Big Pets 
 1991 – First-place award, New York Book Show, The Big Pets
 1991 – Parent's Choice Award for Illustration, Glasses—Who Needs 'Em?
 1991 – New York Times Best Books of the Year citation, Glasses—Who Needs 'Em?
 1991 – ALA Notable Children's Book citation, Glasses—Who Needs 'Em? 
 1992 – Library of Congress Books for Children, Glasses—Who Needs 'Em? 
 1992 – A Publishers Weekly #1 bestseller, The Stinky Cheese Man, and Other Fairly Stupid Tales 
 1992 – Caldecott Honor Book, The Stinky Cheese Man, and Other Fairly Stupid Tales
 1992 – New York Times A Best Illustrated Book of the Year, The Stinky Cheese Man, and Other Fairly Stupid Tales
 1992 – New York Times Notable Children's Book, The Stinky Cheese Man, and Other Fairly Stupid Tales 
 1992 – School Library Journal, A Best Book of the Year, The Stinky Cheese Man, and Other Fairly Stupid Tales 
 1993 – Publishers Weekly, A Best Book of the Year, The Happy Hocky Family
 1995 – Booklist Editors' Choice citation - Math Curse 
 1996 – Publishers Weekly, A Best Children's Book - Math Curse
 1996 – ALA Best Book for Young Adults citation - Math Curse
 1996 – No. 1 Publishers Weekly bestseller, James and the Giant Peach
 1998 – No. 1 Publishers Weekly bestseller, Dr. Seuss' Hooray for Diffendoofer Day!
 2006 – New York Times Best Illustrated Book of the Year, John, Paul, George, and Ben
 2006 – New York Times Notable Book, John, Paul, George, and Ben
 2006 – Child magazine Best Book of the Year, John, Paul, George, and Ben
 2006 – National Parenting Publication Gold Award, John, Paul, George, and Ben
 2006 – School Library Journal Best Book of the Year, John, Paul, George, and Ben
 2006 – Horn Book Fanfare, John, Paul, George, and Ben 
 2006 – Publishers Weekly Best Book of the Year, John, Paul, George, and Ben
 2006 – Parenting Best Book of the Year, John, Paul, George, and Ben
 2006 – Child magazine Best Book of the Year, John, Paul, George, and Ben
 2007 – Zena Sutherland Award, John, Paul, George, and Ben
 2008 – Read Boston's Best Read Aloud Book, Madam President
 2010 – Winner, Ladybug Picture Book Award, Princess Hyacinth
 2010 – A Publishers Weekly Best Children's Book, It's a Book
 2010 – Goodreads Choice Awards Winner, Favorite Picture Book, It's a Book 
 2010 – A New York Times Notable Book, It's a Book 
 2010 – Boston Globe, Ten Best Books of 2010, It's a Book 
 2011 – Caldecott Honor, Grandpa Green
 2011 – A New York Times Best Illustrated Book, Grandpa Green
 2011 – Publishers Weekly Best Children's Book, Grandpa Green
 2011 – Silver medal Society of Illustrators, Grandpa Green
 2011 – School Library Journal Best Book, Grandpa Green
 2015 – A Washington Post Best Book of the Year, Return to Augie Hobble
 2015 – L.A. Times Summer Recommended Reading List, Return to Augie Hobble 
 2015 – Amazon Editors' Picks for Summer Reading: Ages 9–12, Return to Augie Hobble
 2015 – Publishers Weekly Best Summer Books, Return to Augie Hobble
 2016 – Irish Times, A Best Book of the Year, Penguin Problems
 2016 – Bank Street, A Best Children's Book of the Year, Penguin Problems
 2017 – NEIBA finalist, A Perfect Day
 2017 – An NPR Best Book of the Year, A Perfect Day
 2017 – Kate Greenaway Medal, There Is a Tribe of Kids
 2018 – An ALSC Notable Children's Book, A Perfect Day
 2018 – A New York Times Best Illustrated Book, A House That Once Was

References

External links

 
 
 
 
 

1959 births
American children's book illustrators
American children's writers
People from Corona, California
Artists from Tulsa, Oklahoma
Writers from California
Writers from Tulsa, Oklahoma
Living people